The Museum of Natural Sciences of Belgium is a museum dedicated to natural history, located in Brussels, Belgium. The museum is a part of the Royal Belgian Institute of Natural Sciences. Its most important pieces are 30 fossilised Iguanodon skeletons, which were discovered in 1878 in Bernissart, Belgium.

The Dinosaur Hall of the museum is the world's largest museum hall completely dedicated to dinosaurs. Another famous piece is the Ishango bone, which was discovered in 1960 by Jean de Heinzelin de Braucourt in the Belgian Congo. The museum also houses a research department and a public exhibit department.

History
The Museum of Natural Sciences was founded on 31 March 1846, as a descendant of the Musée de Bruxelles of 1802. It was based on the collection established by Prince Charles Alexander of Lorraine, dating from the 18th century. The scientist and politician Bernard du Bus de Gisignies became the first director of the museum in 1846, and on this occasion, he donated 2,474 birds from his own collection to the museum.

In 1860, during the construction of new fortifications around Antwerp, several fossils were found, mainly of whales, and they were acquired by the museum. The museum also obtained the skeletons of a bowhead whale (Balaena mysticetus) and a young blue whale (Balaenoptera musculus), which are still on display today. The same year, the skeleton of a mammoth was unearthed near Lier, in Antwerp, Belgium, and due to the prompt action of the archaeologist François-Joseph Scohy, it was preserved and brought to the museum, where it has been exhibited since 1869. At that time, the only other skeleton of a mammoth on display was in the museum of Saint Petersburg in Russia.

In 1878, the largest find of Iguanodon fossils to date occurred in a coal mine at Bernissart, in Hainaut, Belgium. They were mounted by Louis Dollo and set the standard that was followed for over a century. Found alongside the Iguanodon skeletons were the remains of plants, fish, and other reptiles, including the crocodyliform Bernissartia.

Between 1889 and 1891, the museum moved from its original home at the Palace of Charles of Lorraine into a former convent located on the heights of the park. The building quickly became too narrow and the director of the time, Edward Dupont, entrusted the architect Charles-Emile Janlet the construction of a new southern wing. Work began in 1898 and ended in October 1905. The new rooms were specially designed to accommodate the new collections.
 
In 1950, several modern buildings were added to house new exhibition and storage rooms, as well as premises for the Royal Belgian Institute of Natural Sciences, the research centre of which the museum is now part.

Since 2007, the completely renovated and enlarged Dinosaur Hall (the Janlet wing) of  has been the largest dinosaur hall in the world.

Permanent exhibitions

 The Dinosaur Hall: with the world-famous Iguanodon skeletons (30 almost complete skeletons)
 Of Men and Mammoths: about the evolution of man and about the last ice age in Western Europe.
 The Mammal Gallery: recent and extinct mammals, including a thylacine.
 The North and South Pole: a view of two different worlds in a (plexi)glass tunnel.
 The Whale Hall: skeletons of whales, dolphins, walruses, sirenians, and seals. A small part of the hall is devoted to the whales' role in the economy and their sacrifices to it.
 The Shell Gallery houses a tropical aquarium and a complete survey of the lower classes of invertebrates. The nearby North Sea Discovery Room takes visitors on an interactive tour around beach and sea life at the Belgian coast. The entire collection consists of 9,000,000 specimens and is one of the three biggest shell collections in the world. A great deal was collected by Philippe Dautzenberg.
 The Insect Gallery: insects, spiders, crustaceans and other arthropods, including a vivarium with living specimens. The collection consists of 15,000,000 specimens of which ten thousands are holotypes of great scientific value.
 The Mineral Gallery: crystals, cut gems, meteorites and precious bits of moon rock.
 The Ishango bone, a prehistoric bone counting tool.

In addition to these permanent exhibitions, there are also temporary exhibitions which are always highly interactive.

See also
 Belgian Federal Science Policy Office (BELSPO)
 Geological Survey of Belgium
 Edmond de Sélys Longchamps
 History of Brussels
 Belgium in "the long nineteenth century"

References

Notes

External links

 The museum's official website
 Royal Belgian Institute of Natural Sciences on Google Cultural Institute
 Visiting Dinosaurs at the Museum of Natural Sciences, Brussels, Belgium

Museums in Brussels
Natural history museums
Dinosaur museums
European quarter of Brussels
Shell museums
Insectariums
1846 establishments in Belgium
Museums established in 1846
Organisations based in Belgium with royal patronage